Diaphania equicincta is a moth in the family Crambidae. It was described by George Hampson in 1912. It is found in Mexico (Jalapa, Veracruz), Guatemala and Costa Rica.

The length of the forewings is 13.2–14 mm for males and 13.5–15 mm for females. There are dark-brown costal and external bands on the forewings, as well as a translucent white area with a light purp1e gloss and some yellowish scales on the anal margin. There is an external brown band on the hindwings.

References

Moths described in 1912
Diaphania